Shahid Matahari Training Academy ( –  Mojtame` Āmūzeshī Shahīd Maţaharī) is a village and academy in Zarqan Rural District, Zarqan District, Shiraz County, Fars Province, Iran. At the 2006 census, its population was 72, in 16 families.

References 

Populated places in Zarqan County